The Young Liberal National Party, or the Young LNP, is the youth division of the Liberal National Party of Queensland, and membership is open to those between 16 and 30 years of age. It exists only in Queensland, and is affiliated both with the federal Young Liberal Movement and the federal Young Nationals.

The Young LNP aims to provide a setting for young people aged between 16 and 30 to express their political views and contribute to the shaping of Queensland's political landscape. They provide the LNP with new ideas and policies designed to keep the Party in touch with mainstream youth.

History
The Young LNP was founded in 2008, following the merger of Liberal and National parties in Queensland. The Young LNP's history dates back to the founding of the Queensland Young Liberals in 1949, by Sir James Killen, and the Queensland Young Nationals in 1958. The Young LNP recognises the contribution of Sir James Killen to youth politics by holding an annual public speaking competition in his name.

Current Executive

The executive of the Young LNP is elected by branch delegates at the Young LNP Convention held in May each year.

Elected officials

Branches
The Young LNP is made up of local branches, which are spread across the state from the Gold Coast in the south to Cairns in the north. The branch is the basic party unit and it is in branches that most Young LNP activities take place. Members of the Young LNP are all members of a branch of their choice located in their region.  Branches meet regularly, have social functions, assist in election campaigns, debate policy, and are self-governed by their own executive committees.  The following is a list of the branches which make up the Young LNP:

Bowman YLNP
Brisbane Central YLNP
Brisbane North YLNP
Capricornia YLNP (Rockhampton)
Dawson YLNP (Mackay)
Far North Queensland YLNP (Cairns)
Gold Coast YLNP
Lilley YLNP
Moreton YLNP
Northern YLNP (Townsville)
Ryan YLNP
South Brisbane YLNP
South West Queensland YLNP
Sunshine Coast YLNP
West Brisbane YLNP
Wide Bay YLNP

References

Youth wings of political parties in Australia
Liberal Party of Australia
National Party of Australia